Andrew Thompson Judson (November 29, 1784 – March 17, 1853) was a United States representative from Connecticut and a United States district judge of the United States District Court for the District of Connecticut.

Education and early career
Judson was born on November 29, 1784, in Eastford, Windham County, Connecticut, the son of Elisabeth (Work) and Andrew Judson. Judson received limited schooling and read law in 1806. He was admitted to the bar and entered private practice in Montpelier, Vermont, from 1806 to 1809. He continued private practice in Canterbury, Connecticut, from 1809 to 1815, 1817 to 1819, and in 1834. He was Canterbury town clerk at the time of the Prudence Crandall affair, on which see below.

Connecticut politician
He was a member of the Connecticut House of Representatives in 1816, and from 1822 to 1825. He was state's attorney for Windham County from 1819 to 1833. He was a member of the Connecticut Senate from 1830 to 1832.

Toleration Party

While in the Connecticut House of Representatives, Judson was one of the most active members of the Toleration Party, which had for its object disunion between church and state. After a severe struggle the Tolerationists, aided by the Democrats, succeeded in setting aside the charter that was granted by Charles II of England, and adopted the new Constitution of 1818, which remained in effect until 1965.

White supremacist and colonizationist
Judson was the leading enemy of African Americans in the state of Connecticut. He believed that they were inferior to whites, and if not in use as slaves should be moved to Africa, "where they came from". He was an officer of the American Colonization Society, which raised funds for the relocation of a few thousand African Americans to the land that became Liberia.

Proposed college for African Americans in New Haven

What was labelled the New Haven Excitement by abolitionist William Lloyd Garrison was the unexpected uproar that followed the proposal by the minister Simeon Jocelyn to establish a "colored" college in New Haven. At the time, 1831, there was none, and blacks would only exceptionally be admitted to any college at all, approximately once every seven years. At a town meeting called by Judson the vote was 99% for rejection. While Judson did not and could not have created the antipathy, he placed himself at the head of it. The project was abandoned.

Led the opposition to Prudence Crandall's school for black girls
A similar incident soon followed in Judson's home town, Canterbury. Although he had earlier welcomed Prudence Crandall's Canterbury Female Boarding School, his support vanished when she accepted a black student and refused pressures to expel her. Judson, Canterbury's most famous and influential citizen, was the organizer of the pressures. "No other person in Connecticut was more fiercely opposed to Crandall's school for black women." He got the Connecticut legislature to pass a law, called a "Black Law", prohibiting the teaching of blacks not from Connecticut. She was arrested and spent a night in the county jail, a fact that was publicized. While he was only assistant prosecutor of Crandall's first trial, upon which the state's attorney for the county and the court's next choice, state Lieutenant Governor Ebenezer Stoddard, were suspiciously both "ill", since he was the only one of three prosecutors with knowledge of the case he called and questioned the witnesses, and gave the prosecution's closing argument. The jury was unable to reach a verdict. At her retrial he was no longer "assistant" prosecutor. She was found guilty, but upon appeal, the appeals court, apparently seeking a way to avoid taking a position, dismissed the case on a technicality. At this point opposition to Crandall's school became violent: an attempt to set the building on fire, an attack at night breaking all the windows. For her students' safety she closed the school, and left the state. Since 2014 she has been Connecticut's state heroine.

While this was going on, Judson explained his position to one of Crandall's supporters, the Brooklyn, Connecticut, abolitionist minister Samuel J. May:
Mr. May, we are not merely opposed to the establishment of that school in Canterbury; we mean there shall not be such a school set up anywhere in our State. The colored people never can rise from their menial condition in our country; they ought not to be permitted to rise here. They are an inferior race of beings, and never can or ought to be recognized as the equals of the whites. Africa is the place for them. I am in favor of the Colonization scheme. Let the niggers and their descendants be sent back to their fatherland and there improve themselves as much as they may, and civilize and Christianize the natives, if they can. ...You are violating the Constitution of our Republic, which settled forever the status of the black men in this land. They belong to Africa. Let them be sent back there, or kept as they are here. The sooner you Abolitionists abandon your project the better for our country, for the niggers, and yourselves.

Judson did appear as a character witness on behalf of Reuben Crandall, Prudence's brother, a physician who was arrested in Washington, D.C., for (illegally) possessing abolitionist literature and was nearly lynched. He did so because Reuben had recommended to Prudence that she abandon her plans to educate black girls in Connecticut. The prosecutor was Francis Scott Key, former partner of Roger Taney, who hoped to use the trial to advance the cause of colonization; he was a founding member of the American Colonization Society. After eight months in jail Reuben was found not guilty, but died shortly after of tuberculosis contracted in jail.

U.S. representative and federal judge

Judson was elected as a Jacksonian Democrat from Connecticut's at-large congressional district to the United States House of Representatives of the 24th United States Congress and served from March 4, 1835, until July 4, 1836, when he resigned to accept a federal judicial appointment. Another source says that he was defeated for reelection. During that time the abolitionist, and mentor of Prudence Crandall, William Garrison sent him a petition from 46 residents of Brooklyn, Connecticut, urging him to end slavery in the District of Columbia. Judson made no response.

Judson was nominated by President Andrew Jackson on June 28, 1836, to a seat on the United States District Court for the District of Connecticut vacated by Judge William Bristol. He was confirmed by the United States Senate on July 4, 1836, and received his commission the same day. His service terminated on March 17, 1853, due to his death in Canterbury. He was interred in Hyde Cemetery in Canterbury.

Amistad case

Judson presided over the famous case United States v. The Amistad in 1840. Given his views on race and slavery, Judson surprised many observers by ruling in favor of the captured Africans and ordering that they be freed and safely returned to their homes in Africa. The administration of President Martin Van Buren appealed Judson's ruling to the United States Supreme Court which upheld Judson's decision.

References

Sources

 
  This source gives Ashford as his place of birth.  It also puts Judson in the Connecticut legislature by 1816, but doesn't say anything about his length of service there.

1784 births
1853 deaths
People from Eastford, Connecticut
Toleration Party politicians
Judges of the United States District Court for the District of Connecticut
United States federal judges appointed by Andrew Jackson
19th-century American judges
Members of the Connecticut House of Representatives
American prosecutors
Jacksonian members of the United States House of Representatives from Connecticut
19th-century American politicians
United States federal judges admitted to the practice of law by reading law
American white supremacists
People from Canterbury, Connecticut
Prudence Crandall
African-American history of Connecticut